The 1985 Purdue Boilermakers football team represented the Purdue University in the 1985 Big Ten Conference football season. Led by fourth-year head coach Leon Burtnett, the Boilermakers compiled an overall record of 5–6 with a mark of 3–5 in conference play, placing seventh in the Big Ten. Purdue played home games at Ross–Ade Stadium in West Lafayette, Indiana.

Quarterback Jim Everett led the nation in total offense with 3,589 yards, which was also a program record, since broken by Drew Brees. Everett finished sixth in balloting for the Heisman Trophy.

Schedule

Personnel

Game summaries

at Pittsburgh

Ball State
 Jim Everett 24/32, 340 yards

Notre Dame
 Jim Everett 27/49, 368 yards

Illinois
 Jim Everett 27/47, 464 yards

at Ohio State

 Mark Jackson – 6 receptions, 132 yards

Michigan State
 Jim Everett 34/51, 315 yards

Northwestern
 James Medlock 23 rushes, 129 yards

Iowa

    
    
    
    
    
    
    
    
    

 Jim Everett 23/32, 315 yards

at Indiana

Awards and honors
 Jim Everett, sixth in Heisman Trophy votinh

1986 NFL Draft

References

Purdue
Purdue Boilermakers football seasons
Purdue Boilermakers football